Nikolay Korolyov may refer to:

 Nikolay Korolyov (boxer) (1917–1974), Soviet boxer and Honoured Master of Sport
 Nikolay Korolyov (sergeant) (1921–1945), Soviet soldier and Hero of the Soviet Union
 Nikolay Korolyov (nationalist) (born 1981), Russian nationalist